1+1 Media Group (doing business as TRK «Studiia 1+1», LLC) is one of the largest media conglomerates in Ukraine.  The General Director of the Group is Yaroslav Pakholchuk.

Structure
1+1 Media Group comprises seven Ukrainian TV channels, 1+1, 2+2, TET, PLUSPLUS, Bigudi, UNIAN TV and 1+1 International. It also controls the online news platforms TSN.ua, UNIAN, Glavred.info, Telekritika and Dusia. It had controlled the English language satellite television channel Ukraine Today until it was shut down in 2016.

The structure of the group includes the production company '1+1 Production' which is responsible for the creation of in-house TV formats and the adaptation of international formats for broadcast on the several TV channels of the group, including reality and dating shows, talent shows, scripted realities, TV series, sitcoms, documentary and sports programs, original programs and information broadcasting. The production company not only covers in-house needs, but also works with external customers.

Ukrainian oligarch Ihor Kolomoyskyi has financial interests in the group.

Activity 
After launching 1+1 International in 2006, which is aimed at the Ukrainian diaspora, the group started its first attempt at gaining part of the international TV market by launching the English language Ukraine Today in August 2014.

In 2012 the group started the "Green Office" project which aims to minimize negative impact on the environment.

In November 2017 1+1 Media Group launched the charity fund "You are not alone" (Ти не один), which runs multiple projects to help and encourage children battling serious illnesses, people with disabilities and ATO veterans.

In July 2018 1+1 announced the launch of the 1+1 International streaming app.

In January 2019 the Ukrainian National Council of Television and Radio refused to give 1+1's news channel UNIAN TV a digital license. The group claimed the refusal was unfounded and politically motivated.

See also

 1+1 (TV channel)
 2+2 (TV channel)
 TET (TV channel)
 PLUSPLUS 
 1+1 International 
 UNIAN (Ukrainian Independent Information Agency)

References

External links

Ukrainian brands
Privat Group
Television networks in Ukraine
Former Time Warner subsidiaries